As a nickname, Brooksie may refer to:

People with the nickname 

 Harry J. Brooks (1903–1928), American test pilot, so called by Henry Ford
 Louise Brooks (1906-1985), American actress
 Neil Brooks (born 1962), Australian former swimmer
 Phyllis Brooks (1915–1995), so named by Cary Grant, to whom she was rumored to have married
 Steven Brooks (lacrosse) (born 1984), American professional lacrosse player
 Brooks Orpik (born 1980), American National Hockey League player
 Larry Brooks (journalist) (born 1949/1950), American sports journalist

Fictional characters with the nickname 

 Claire Brooks, in the radio drama series Let George Do It (1946–1954)
 Gloria Brooks, in the short story "Delilah and the Space Rigger" by Robert A. Heinlein

See also 

Lists of people by nickname